Carlernst Ortwein, pseudonym Conny Odd, (21 December 1916 – 22 December 1986) was a German classical pianist and composer.

Life 
Ortwein was born in 1916 in Leipzig as the son of the music teacher Karl Ortwein. From 1927 he was a member of the Thomanerchor.

For helping his "half-Jew" teacher Günter Raphael, after his dismissal from the university, Ortwein also had to leave. He continued his private studies. From 1937 he began a pianistic activity at German radio stations. During this time he also wrote his first compositions. From 1939 to 1945 he was called up for military service. After further activities as a pianist, he was head of the serious music department at the Leipzig radio station from 1947 to 1949. As there was a lack of entertainment compositions at the station, he began to compose in this field and took the pseudonym Conny Odd.

From 1950 to 1953 he was a freelance artist. From 1953 to 1961 he was a lecturer at the Music Pedagogical Institute of the Karl-Marx-University Leipzig. In 1962 he received a lectureship for composition and instrumentation at the University of Music and Theatre Leipzig, where he became a professor in 1976.

Among his students were Volker Bräutigam, Michael Heubach, Walter Thomas Heyn, Karl Ottomar Treibmann, Volkmar Leimert and Rainer Lischka.

Ortwein wrote over 100 radio play scores, about 50 film scores, numerous chansons, choral songs and orchestral works. Of his light music, his "Vergnügliche Reisebekanntschaften eines Pianisten" from 1951 became best known. As Conny Odd, he was the most successful operetta composer of the GDR next to Gerd Natschinski, with some works having a musical theatre character.

In the DEFA film Geliebte weiße Maus from 1964, for which he wrote the music, he also appeared as pianist of the dance orchestra.

Ortwein died in Leipzig at the age of 70.

Prizes 
 Kunstpreis der DDR (1964)
 Kunstpreis der Stadt Leipzig (1968)
  in collective with the stages of the city of Gera (1971)
 Kunstpreis des Deutscher Turn- und Sportbund (1977)

Instrumental music 
with year and place of the premiere
 Zum Glück hat sie Pech, 1955, Volkstheater Rostock
 Alarm in Point l'Évêque, 1958, Städtische Bühnen Erfurt, bearbeitet Gangster lieben keine Blumen, 1974, Metropoltheater Berlin
 Hände hoch, Mister Copper!, 1962, 
 Irene und die Kapitäne, 1967, Staatsoperette Dresden
 Karambolage, 1969, 
  Man liest kein fremdes Tagebuch, 1974,

Filmography 
 1954: Der Teufel und der Drescher
 1957: Die Zauberschere
 1960: Alarm im Kasperletheater
 1961: Das Stacheltier – Die Mutprobe
 1961: Da helfen keine Pillen
 1961: Das Rabauken-Kabarett
 1963: Der Teufelstaler
 1963: Miau'''
 1964: Wie Pumphut zu seinem Namen kam 1964: Aprikosenbäumchen 1964: Geliebte weiße Maus 1965: Der fliegende Großvater 1966: Steinzeitlegende 1966: Der gestiefelte Kater 1968: Die sieben Raben 1970: Der Teufel aus der Flasche 1979: Stern und Blume 1983: Erlebte Träume Radio plays music 
 1952: Howard Fast: 30 Silberlinge – Regie: Günther Rücker (Berliner Rundfunk)
 1953: Konstantin Trenjow: Ljubow Jarowaja – Regie: Günter Rücker (Berliner Rundfunk)
 1958: Henrik Ibsen: Stützen der Gesellschaft – Regie: Erich-Alexander Winds (Rundfunk der DDR)
 1964: : Die Ohrfeige – Regie:  (Rundfunk der DDR)

 Literature 
 : Operette A – Z, Henschelverlag Kunst und Gesellschaft Berlin 1981, 

 External links 
 
 Die Vergnüglichen Reisebekanntschaften eines Pianisten'' by Conny Odd, performed by Siegfried Stöckigt on youtube
 

1916 births
1986 deaths
20th-century classical composers
20th-century German composers
German classical pianists
German film score composers
German operetta composers
Academic staff of Leipzig University
Male classical pianists
German music educators
Musicians from Leipzig
20th-century German male musicians